William George O'Brien (August 25, 1924 – May 8, 2005) was an American football player.

Born in Detroit, O'Brien attended University of Detroit Jesuit High School. He played professional football in the National Football League as a halfback for the Detroit Lions. He appeared in nine games for the Lions during the 1947 season.

References

1924 births
2005 deaths
Players of American football from Detroit
Detroit Lions players